The following table lists the highest and lowest temperatures recorded in the 50 U.S. states, the District of Columbia, and the 5 inhabited U.S. territories during the past two centuries, in both Fahrenheit and Celsius. If two dates have the same temperature record (e.g. record low of 40 °F in 1911 in Aibonito and 1966 in San Sebastian in Puerto Rico), only the most recent date is shown.

List of U.S. States & Territories

*Also on earlier date or dates in that state or territory
Unreferenced data assumed to be from NOAA

See also
 Canadian provincial and territorial temperature extremes
 February 2023 North American cold wave - Mount Washington in New Hampshire experienced a record breaking wind chill of −108 °F (−78 °C).

Notes

References

External links
NOAA Satellite and Information Service, National Climatic Data Center
NOAA Website - Weather Extremes
NOAA Website - Record Highest/Lowest Temperatures by State

Climate and weather statistics
Temperature extremes
Lists of extreme temperatures